Per Nils Myrberg (born 11 July 1933) is a Swedish singer and actor. Born in Stockholm, Myrberg has appeared in 45 films since 1957 including The Girl with the Dragon Tattoo.

He is father to Olle Myrberg and Fredrik Myrberg.

Filmography

References

External links

1933 births
Living people
Eugene O'Neill Award winners
Litteris et Artibus recipients
Male actors from Stockholm
Swedish male film actors
20th-century Swedish male actors